Telita is a rural locality in the local government area (LGA) of Dorset in the North-east LGA region of Tasmania. The 2016 census recorded a population of 22 for the state suburb of Telita.

History 
Telita was gazetted as a locality in 1969. The name is believed to be an Aboriginal word for "to chirrup". 

First named “Ayr”, it was changed to Telita about 1923.

Geography
The Ringarooma River forms most of the southern boundary.

Road infrastructure 
Route A3 (Tasman Highway) passes to the south-east. Derby Back Road and Telita Road provide access to the locality.

References

Towns in Tasmania
Localities of Dorset Council (Australia)